Sugino (written: 杉野) is a Japanese surname. Notable people with the surname include:

People with the surname
, Japanese character designer
, Creator and designer of most of the Game Boy line
, Japanese actress, writer, producer and film director
Sugino Yoshiko (杉野 芳子, 1892-1978), Japanese fashion designer and educator
, Japanese martial artist and film choreographer

Fictional characters
, a character in the manga series Assassination Classroom

Other
 Sugino, a Japanese bicycle components manufacturing company
 Sugino Fashion College

Japanese-language surnames